The Towson Tigers women's basketball team represents Towson University in Towson, Maryland in NCAA Division I competition. The school's team currently competes in the Colonial Athletic Association (CAA) and play their home games at SECU Arena.

History
Towson began play in 1967. They played in MAIAW Division II from 1967 to 1982 before joining the East Coast Conference in 1982. They played in the Big South Conference from 1992 to 1995 and the America East Conference from 1995 to 2001 before joining the CAA in 2001. They made the WBI in 2010, their first ever postseason appearance. As of the end of the 2021–22 season, the Tigers have an all-time record of 631–709.

Year by year results
Conference tournament winners noted with # Source

NCAA tournament results

WNIT results

WBI results

References

External links